Zander is an unincorporated community located in the town of Gibson, Manitowoc County, Wisconsin.

History
The community was named after an early settler, Helmuth Zander. Helmuth was the brother of William Zander.

Notes

Unincorporated communities in Manitowoc County, Wisconsin
Unincorporated communities in Wisconsin